Andreas Miralis (born 21 September 1987 in Athens) is a Greek water polo player. At the 2012 Summer Olympics, he competed for the Greece men's national water polo team in the men's event. He is 6 ft 0 inches tall.

References

Greek male water polo players
1987 births
Living people
Olympic water polo players of Greece
Water polo players at the 2012 Summer Olympics
Water polo players from Athens